The Face is the sixth Japanese studio album (eleventh overall) by South Korean singer BoA. It was released on February 27, 2008. The album was released a week after her single, "Be with You." The full album is known to have total of fifteen tracks along with 3 different types of packaging: regular CD, CD+DVD, and first press. 

Commercially, The Face marked BoA's sixth consecutive number-one album on the Oricon Albums Chart in Japan, making her the solo artist with the second-most number-one albums in the country's history at the time, with the first being Ayumi Hamasaki with eight number-one albums.

Production
The production of The Face started with her "Sweet Impact" single, released in mid-2007. Three months after the release of her fifth studio album, "Made in Twenty (20). "Sweet Impact" was first featured in a Fasico CM in January 2007. "Sweet Impact" also features a B-side "Bad Drive" and it sold 42,789 in Japan and 5,000 in South Korea.

Approximately five months later, she released another single, entitled "Love Letter". It became her second single to be featured on her sixth studio album. "Love Letter" contains two B-sides: "Diamond Heart" and "Beautiful Flowers." At first "Beautiful Flowers" was chosen by the Yokohama BayStars (a baseball team in Japan's Central League), as the team's official theme song during their 2007 season. "Diamond Heart" was used to promote Toshiba's W53T, featuring BoA herself.

Three months after the release of "Love Letter", BoA once again released another single entitled: "Lose Your Mind", which was released on December 12, 2007. It hit its peak position at #6 and sold total of 22,961 copies as of December 26, 2007.

Shortly after "Lose Your Mind", BoA announced another single, "Be with You.", which was planned to be released along with her sixth Japanese studio album. But due to competition on February 20, 2008, with other major artists, the album was pushed backwards a week to February 27, 2008, to avoid conflicts.

Music videos
Currently it is confirmed that 4 possible music videos (or PVs) will be on the album: "Sweet Impact", "Love Letter", "Lose Your Mind" (feat. Yutaka Furukawa from Doping Panda), and "Be with You." (Listed in order of release.)

Sweet Impact
The "Sweet Impact" PV was inspired by Michael Jackson's Moonwalker.

Love Letter
The "Love Letter" PV officially aired on early September before the single's release.

Lose Your Mind
The PV for "Lose Your Mind" features BoA as a supermodel on the catwalk. She and two other female backup dancers start dancing on the catwalk and are joined by three male dancers. The music video also shows BoA in a short black wig. Yutaka Furukawa from rock group Doping Panda also makes an appearance in the music video playing the electric guitar. BoA's three outfits in the music video are a huge contrast to each other. She and her backup dancers are featured wearing black clothes. Later in the music video they are all wearing more casual Japanese style clothes.

Be with You.
This ballad was featured in the Japanese film, "10 promises with my dog". The PV shows scenes of BoA in a canoe, on a couch, and spending time with a Golden Retriever. Also expressing how much she remembers being with you or in her case her lover. Also that she wants to live the promises that she made with him and to forget all the troubles so long as they are together.

Track listing

Charts

Weekly charts

Monthly charts

Year-end charts

Sales and certifications

Singles

References

External links
BoA's official site

2008 albums
BoA albums
Avex Group albums